The 23rd annual Beijing College Student Film Festival took place in Beijing, China between April 9 and May 10. Miss Partners was selected as the festival's opening night film.

Winners and nominees
{| class=wikitable
|-
| valign="top" width="50%"|

The Master – Xu Haofeng 
A Fool – Chen Jianbin
Tharlo – Pema Tseden
Goodbye' – Degena
Mr. Six – Guan Hu

| valign="top" width="50%"|Jia Zhangke – Mountains May Depart 
Chen Sicheng – Detective Chinatown
Pema Tseden – Tharlo
Guan Hu – Mr. Six
Cao Baoping – The Dead End

|-
| valign="top" width="50%"|

 Detective Chinatown – Chen Sicheng 
Young Love Lost – Chen Jianzhong, Lu Nei
The Master – Xu Haofeng
A Fool – Chen Jianbin
Mojin: The Lost Legend – Zhang Jialu

| valign="top" width="50%"|

 A Fool|- 
| valign="top" width="50%"|

 Feng Xiaogang – Mr. SixWang Qianyuan – Saving Mr. Wu 
Duan Yihong – The Dead End 
Chen Jianbin – A Fool 
Liao Fan – The Master
 
| valign="top" width="50%"|

 Bai Baihe – Go Away Mr. TumorXu Qing – Mr. Six 
Jiang Qinqin – A Fool 
Li Meng – Young Love Lost 
Song Jia – The Master

|-
| valign="top" width="50%"|

 River, Gtsngbo, Fluss – Yangjin Lamu 
Tharlo – Xidenima
Out in the Silence – Lang Yueting

| valign="top" width="50%"|Young Love Lost – Xiang Guoqiang 
A Fool – Chen Jianbin
Goodbye – Degena
Jian Bing Man  – Da Peng
Goodbye Mr. Loser – Yan Fei, Peng Damo

|-
| valign="top" width="50%"|Mojin: The Lost Legend 
The Master 
Monster Hunt 
Detective Chinatown
The Love in 1980s

| valign="top" width="50%"|Tharlo – Pema Tseden 
River, Gtsngbo, Fluss – Sonthar Gyal
The Master – Xu Haofeng
|- 
| valign="top" width="50%"|Alec Su| valign="top" width="50%"|

 Li Chen|- 
| valign="top" width="50%"|Miriam Yeung| valign="top" width="50%"|Mr. Six'''|}

References

External links
  23rd Beijing College Student Film Festival Neteast''

23
2016 film festivals
2016 festivals in Asia
Bei